The 2012 Formula 3 Brazil Open was the third Formula 3 Brazil Open race held at Autódromo José Carlos Pace from January 19–22, 2012.  For this year the category presents a new regulation about the tyres. Made in Turkey, these compounds were used on main F-3 championships around the world, such as British series.

After a race with accidents, the Brazilian Lucas Foresti of the Cesário Fórmula was crowned his second
title. André Negrão competing for the Hitech Racing finished in second place, with class B winner Vinícius Alvarenga finished in third.

Drivers and teams
 All cars are powered by Berta engines, and will run on Pirelli tyres.

Classification

Qualifying

Race 1

Race 2

Pre-final Grid

Pre-final Race

Notes
1. – Guerin was penalized with 20 seconds for false start.

Final Race

See also
Formula Three Sudamericana
Formula Three

References

External links
Official website of the Formula 3 Brazil Open

Formula 3 Brazil Open
Formula 3 Brazil Open
Brazil Open
Brazil F3
Formula 3 Brazil Open